Isheyevka is the name of several inhabited localities in Russia.

Urban localities
Isheyevka, Ulyanovsk Oblast, a work settlement under the administrative jurisdiction of Isheyevsky Settlement Okrug of Ulyanovsky District of Ulyanovsk Oblast

Rural localities
Isheyevka, Penza Oblast, a settlement in Balkashinsky Selsoviet of Belinsky District of Penza Oblast